Harry Earnest Cummins, III, known as Bud Cummins (born August 6, 1959), is an American attorney, businessman and politician. He served as United States Attorney with five years of service from 2001 to 2006 in the United States District Court for the Eastern District of Arkansas.

Career
Cummins was born in Enid, Oklahoma. He graduated from the University of Arkansas and eventually moved to Little Rock, Arkansas. In 1989, he obtained a J.D. degree from the University of Arkansas at Little Rock William H. Bowen School of Law. Subsequently, he served as a law clerk for United States Magistrate Judge John F. Forster, and later was clerk to chief United States District Judge Stephen M. Reasoner. After his federal clerkships, he set up a private law practice.

In 1996, he ran as a Republican candidate for Arkansas' second district in the House of Representatives. He lost roughly 52 percent to 48 percent to Democrat Vic Snyder. He later served as Governor Mike Huckabee's chief legal counsel. In 2000, he was an elector representing Arkansas' second electoral district at the Electoral College and cast his vote for Texas Governor George W. Bush. In 2001, shortly after becoming President of the United States, Bush nominated Cummins to be the United States Attorney for the Eastern District of Arkansas, a position that he held until 2006. During his tenure as U.S. Attorney, his office successfully investigated and prosecuted several high-profile cases including the conviction of a group responsible for the largest theft of electronic personal identity data up to that time.

After leaving the U.S. Attorney's Office, Cummins re-entered private practice, specializing in white-collar criminal matters, complex multi-party litigation, and compliance. His firm provides compliance services to state regulated cannabis cultivation and dispensary companies.

In 2017, Cummins joined Avenue Strategies, a consulting, advocacy, public affairs and management group in Washington, D.C.

Cummins now practices as both a lawyer and a lobbyist, also represents DOJ white collar targets in the U.S. or international clients targeted by DOJ or the Treasury Department.

In 2015, Cummins re-entered the political arena when he agreed to serve as the Arkansas chairman for the presidential campaign of New Jersey Governor Chris Christie. Cummins and Christie served together as U.S. Attorneys during the George W. Bush administration. After Christie withdrew from the 2016 presidential primary race, Cummins subsequently agreed to serve as Arkansas chairman of Donald Trump's presidential campaign.

Cummins served as a Trump whip at the Republican National Convention, held in Cleveland in July 2016. In September 2016, Cummins temporarily relocated to Washington, D.C. to serve on the Trump presidential transition team.

Controversy over dismissal

Cummins received national attention when he was dismissed by United States Attorney General Alberto Gonzales despite having received positive job reviews. 

Cummins was informed in June 2006 that his resignation would be desired, and as part of the transition, his replacement, Tim Griffin, had worked for Cummins' office as a special assistant United States attorney since September 2006 onward.
Cummins resigned effective December 20, 2006. He was called "one of the most distinguished lawyers in Arkansas".

Early in the congressional investigations of the firings, Deputy Attorney General Paul McNulty testified that Cummins was removed for no reason except to install a former aide to Karl Rove: 37-year-old Tim Griffin, a former opposition research director for the Republican National Committee.
Cummins, apparently, "was ousted after Harriet E. Miers, the former White House counsel, intervened on behalf of Griffin." In fact, White House emails uncovered during investigations showed that Griffin laid the groundwork for the dismissal of Cummins, telling staff members in the White House that Cummins was widely seen by members of the Arkansas bar as "lazy" and "ineffective."  Sara Taylor and Scott Jennings later testified that they believed Cummins to be a sub-par attorney based solely on statements made by his intra-party rival, Tim Griffin. Cummins told the Senate Judiciary Committee "that Mike Elston, the deputy attorney general's top aide, threatened him with retaliation in a phone call [in February 2007] if he went public." Emails show that Cummins passed on the warning to some of the other Attorneys who were fired.

Reportedly Monica Goodling, who formerly worked for Tim Griffin at the Republican National Committee, "took a leading role in making sure that Griffin replaced Cummins. Documents released to Congress include communications between Goodling and Scott Jennings, Rove's deputy."

Cummins answered a House Judiciary Committee interrogatory about the experience:

Cummins had been investigating the administration of Republican Missouri Governor Matt Blunt regarding allegations that certain individuals who worked for Blunt had violated the law in the awarding of fee offices. On October 4, 2006, Cummins himself announced that the investigation had concluded and that no charges were filed against anyone. "Cummins' statement at the time included a specific reference to Blunt, which he acknowledged was unusual, but was consistent with department policies and justified in light of leaks and erroneous reporting. The statement made clear that 'at no time was Governor Blunt a target, subject, or witness in the investigation, nor was he implicated in any allegation being investigated. Any allegations or inferences to the contrary are uninformed and erroneous.'"  Cummins has said multiple times that he does not believe the Missouri investigation had anything to do with his dismissal.

Role in Trump-Ukraine scandal
On November 24, 2019, Cummins' name came to light in relation to the Trump–Ukraine scandal. In response to inquiries from reporters with TPM and ABC News, Cummins confirmed that as early as October 2018 he had acted "as an intermediary between certain Ukrainian interests and federal law enforcement." This role came up in a letter sent by Rudy Giuliani to Senator Lindsey Graham of South Carolina on the previous day (November 23, 2019), and although Giuliani did not name him, Cummins confirmed that he was the intermediary referred to in Giuliani's letter. Cummins noted to the reporters that he had not vetted the Ukrainian interests who contacted him, who he declined to name. He further noted that, in his communication to Geoffrey Berman, the Manhattan-based United States Attorney for the Southern District of New York, he asserted that he couldn't vouch for the veracity of the Ukrainian information, but was passing it along as a matter he considered appropriate for further investigation by an appropriate Federal law enforcement agency. Cummins noted that he took no further actions in this matter once Giuliani's role became public.

References

External links

 

1959 births
Living people
Dismissal of U.S. attorneys controversy
Oklahoma Republicans
Arkansas Republicans
Lawyers from Little Rock, Arkansas
United States Attorneys for the Eastern District of Arkansas
University of Arkansas alumni
William H. Bowen School of Law alumni
Lawyers from Enid, Oklahoma